CYP28A1 is an insect gene belongs to the cytochrome P450 family, first found in Drosophila mettleri (Fruit fly), involved in the detoxification of plant alkaloids.

References 

28
Insect genes